Boy from the Outskirts  is a 1947 Soviet drama film directed by Vasily Zhuravlyov.

Plot 
In the family of the engineer Skvortsov, on one of the outskirts of Moscow, Andrey's son, the future designer of a high-speed firearm, is growing, but for now   an inquisitive and hard-working kid dreaming of studying. Ahead of the Revolution and the Great Patriotic War.

Cast
 Yevgeny Samoylov as Andrey Skvortsov 
 Sergei Lukyanov as father of Andrey 
 Aleksandra Vasilyeva as mother of Andrey 
 Tatiana Okunevskaya as Ira 
 Maya Markova as Lida 
 Yuri Lyubimov as Kostya Smirnov 
 Aleksandr Zrazhevsky as Ryabushkin 
 Nikolai Annenkov as Professor Aleksandr Semyonov 
 Boris Poslavsky as Ivan Avdeyevich 
 Nikolay Bogolyubov as Stepan Shubin
 Anatoli Gonichev as Andrey in childhood 
  as Kostya in childhood 
 Igor Gorlov as Petya
 Irina Mazuruk as Lida in childhood 
 Georgiy Millyar as member of  examination board
 Andrei Abrikosov as member of   Central Committee of the All-Union Communist Party 
 Vyacheslav Novikov as Master
 Pavel Shpringfeld as pilot
 Yelena Yegorova as Yelena Georgiyevna
 Ivan Ryzhov as guard at the entrance of arms factory

References

External links 
 

1947 films
Soviet black-and-white films
Soviet historical drama films
1940s historical drama films
1947 drama films
1940s Russian-language films